Petrovskaya is a rural locality (a village) in Vozhegodskoye Urban Settlement, Vozhegodsky District, Vologda Oblast, Russia. The population was 3 as of 2002.

Geography 
Petrovskaya is located 10 km southwest of Vozhega (the district's administrative centre) by road. Novozhilikha is the nearest rural locality.

References 

Rural localities in Vozhegodsky District